Lake Taupō, in the centre of New Zealand's North Island, is the caldera of the Taupō Volcano, a large rhyolitic supervolcano.  This huge volcano has produced two of the world's most powerful eruptions in geologically recent times.

The volcano is in the Taupō Volcanic Zone, a region of rift volcanic activity that extends from Ruapehu in the south, through the Taupō and Rotorua districts, to Whakaari/White Island, in the Bay of Plenty.

Taupō began erupting about 300,000 years ago. The main eruptions that still affect the surrounding landscape are the dacitic Mount Tauhara eruption 65,000 years ago, the Oruanui eruption about 26,500 years ago, which is responsible for the shape of the modern caldera, and the Hatepe eruption, dated 232 ± 10 CE. There have been many more eruptions, with major ones every thousand years or so (see timeline of last 10,000 years of eruptions).

Taupō Volcano has not erupted for approximately 1,800 years; however, with research beginning in 1979 and published in 2022, the data collated over the 42-year period shows that Taupō Volcano is active with periods of volcanic unrest and has been for some time. Some volcanoes within the Taupō Volcanic Zone have erupted more recently. Mount Tarawera had a moderately violent VEI-5 eruption in 1886, and Whakaari/White Island is frequently active, erupting most recently in December 2019.

Rhyolitic eruptions

The Taupō Volcano erupts rhyolite, a viscous magma, with a high silica content.

If the magma does not contain much gas, rhyolite tends to just form a lava dome.  However, when mixed with gas or steam, rhyolitic eruptions can be extremely violent.  The magma froths to form pumice and ash, which is thrown out with great force.

If the volcano creates a stable plume, high in the atmosphere, the pumice and ash are blown sideways, and eventually fall to the ground, draping the landscape like snow.

If the material thrown out cools more rapidly and becomes denser than the air, it cannot rise as high, and suddenly collapses back to the ground, forming a pyroclastic flow, hitting the surface like water from a waterfall, and spreading sideways across the land at enormous speed.  When the pumice and ash settle, they are sufficiently hot to stick together as a rock called ignimbrite.  Pyroclastic flows can travel hundreds of kilometres an hour.

Earlier eruptions 
Earlier ignimbrite eruptions occurred further north than Taupō.  Some of these were enormous, and two eruptions around 1.25 and 1.0 million years ago were big enough to generate an ignimbrite sheet that covered the North Island from Auckland to Napier.

While Taupō has been active for 300,000 years, explosive eruptions became more common 65,000 years ago.

Oruanui eruption 

The Oruanui eruption of the Taupō Volcano was the world's largest known eruption in the past 70,000 years, with a Volcanic Explosivity Index of 8.

Modern Lake Taupō partly fills the caldera generated during this eruption.

The ignimbrite eruption(s) were possibly not as forceful as that of the later Hatepe eruption but the total impact of this eruption was somewhat greater. Later erosion and sedimentation had long-lasting effects on the landscape, and caused the Waikato River to shift from the Hauraki Plains to its current course through the Waikato to the Tasman Sea.

Hatepe eruption 

The Hatepe eruption (also known as the Taupō or Horomatangi Reef Unit Y eruption) represents the most recent major eruption of the Taupō Volcano, and occurred about 1,800 years ago.  It was the most powerful eruption in the world in the last 5,000 years.

Stages of eruption
The eruption went through several stages.
A minor eruption occurred beneath the ancestral Lake Taupō.
A dramatic increase in activity produced a high eruption column from a second vent, and pumice was deposited over a wide area.
Water entered the first vent and mixed with the magma, producing a white ash-rich pumice fall.
A new vent formed and produced a dark ash- and obsidian-rich fall deposit.
A larger eruption ensued, producing pumice over a huge area, and a small ignimbrite deposit.
The most destructive part of the eruption then occurred.
 Rhyolitic lava domes were extruded some years later, helping form the Horomatangi Reefs and Waitahanui bank. These later smaller eruptions of unknown total size also created large pumice rafts and terminated within decades of the major eruption.

Only Ruapehu was high enough to divert the flow.

The power of the pyroclastic flow was so strong that in some places it eroded more material off the ground surface than it replaced with ignimbrite.  Valleys were filled with ignimbrite, evening out the shape of the land.

All vegetation within the area was flattened.  Loose pumice and ash deposits formed lahars down all the main rivers.

The eruption further expanded the lake, which had formed after the much larger Oruanui eruption.

Dating the Hatepe eruption
Many dates have been given for the Hatepe eruption. One estimated date was 181 CE from ice cores in Greenland and Antarctica. It is possible that the meteorological phenomena described by Fan Ye in China and by Herodian in Rome were due to this eruption, which would give a date of exactly 186. However, ash from volcanic activity does not normally cross hemispheres, and radiocarbon dating by R. Sparks has put the date at 233 CE ± 13 (95% confidence). 
A 2011 14C wiggle-matching paper gave the date 232 ± 5 CE. A 2021 review based on five sources reports 232 ± 10 CE.  

Current activity and future hazards

From May through December 2022 there was increased earthquake activity with lakeside slumping and inundation from a small tsunami and ground deformation. The Volcanic Alert Level for Taupō Volcano was raised to Volcanic Alert Level 1 (minor volcanic unrest) on 20 September 2022.

While no witnessed eruptive event has been recorded from Taupō, there have been seventeen episodes of volcanic unrest since 1872, with the most recent being in 2019 and 2022–2023. This manifested as swarms of seismic activity and ground deformation within the caldera. The present-day magma reservoir is estimated to be at least  in volume and have a melt fraction of >20%–30%.

While Taupō is capable of very large eruptions these remain very unlikely as the majority of the 29 eruptions of various magnitudes in the last 30,000 years have been much smaller. Many have been dome-forming, which may have contributed to lake features such as Motutaiko Island and the Horomatangi Reefs.

Earthquake and tsunami hazards also exist. While most earthquakes are relatively small and associated with magma shifts, the moderate earthquakes associated with eruptions or the numerous rift-associated faults historically have produced tsunami events. The intra-rift Waihi fault, for example, has been associated with 6.5 magnitude earthquakes at recurrence intervals of between 490 and 1,380 years and at least one tsunami related to landslip at the Hipaua steaming cliffs. 

GNS Science continuously monitors Taupō using a network of seismographs and GPS stations. The Horomatangi Reefs area of the lake is associated with active hydrothermal venting and high heat flow. Monitoring of a volcano situated under a lake is challenging, and an eruption might occur with little or no meaningful notice. Live data can be viewed on the GeoNet website.

See also

References

External links

Same data exists in 

Holocene calderas
Pleistocene calderas
Taupō Volcanic Zone
Geology of New Zealand
Calderas of New Zealand
VEI-8 volcanoes
VEI-7 volcanoes
VEI-6 volcanoes
Supervolcanoes
Landforms of Waikato
Tsunamis in New Zealand
Lists of volcanic eruptions
Lake Taupō
Volcanoes of Waikato